The Cameroon Armed Forces are the military of the Republic of Cameroon. The armed forces number 40,000 personnel in ground, air, and naval forces. There are approximately 40,000 troops in the army across three military regions. Approximately 1,300 troops are part of the Cameroonian Navy, which is headquartered at Douala. Under 600 troops are part of the Air Force. There is an additional 12,500 paramilitary troops that serve as a gendarmerie (policing force) or reconnaissance role.

The Cameroonian armed forces have bases spread all over Cameroon, including in Ngaoundéré. Air Force bases are located in Garoua, Yaoundé, Douala and Bamenda.

It has generally remained loyal to the government and acted to ensure the stability of the regime, and not acted as an independent political force. Traditional dependence on the French defense capability, although reduced, continues to be the case as French military advisers remain closely involved in preparing the Cameroonian forces for deployment to the contested Bakassi Peninsula.

"China has an ongoing military-military relationship with Cameroon, which includes training for Cameroonian military students each year in China, technical advisors to assist in repairing Cameroonian military vehicles and naval vessels, and Chinese military sales."

Army
With over 40,000 troops the Army remains the most important component in terms of numbers. The Army is under the responsibility of the Chief of Staff, Major-General Nkoa Atenga, whose staff is in Yaoundé.

Currently the organization dates from 2001 with a distribution in several types of units: combat units, response units (unités d'intervention), unités de soutien et d'appui, and finally special reserve units as part of 3 joint military régions (interarmées) and the 10 military land sectors.

Army units have been trained and equipped to fight in the swampy coastal terrain facing the Bakassi peninsula. Although prepared for an armed conflict with Nigeria in recent years, the Cameroon Army does not have operational experience against other forces, therefore, it is not possible to assess its ability to respond to changing threats and opposing tactics.

Combat units of the army include:
 The Headquarters Brigade, located in Yaoundé. This brigade is responsible for protecting the capital and supporting the institutions. The President of the Republic has to allow any of its deployments.
 Three command and support battalions;
 The Rapid Intervention Battalion (Btaillon d'Intervention Rapide, BIR)
 The  (Brigade d'Intervention Rapide, or also BIR), (which currently has no general staff) and is made up of three rapid response battalions, stationed in Douala, Tiko and Koutaba. These three battalions are respectively the Special Amphibious Battalion (Bataillon Spécial Amphibie; BSA), the Bataillon des Troupes Aéroportées (BTAP), and the Armored Reconnaissance Battalion (Bataillon Blindé de Reconnaissance; BBR) equipped with Type 07P infantry fighting vehicle and PTL-02 tank destroyer bought recently from China. The BSA is inspired by the French Special Forces. This brigade is a tactical battle unit under the authority of the Chief of Staff of the armed forces. For this to be engaged, the President’s agreement is necessary.
 Five motorised infantry brigades, supposed to be stationed in one military sector but which can then be engaged without any regard to the territorial division of the country. These brigades currently do not have a general staff. In theory, they consist of 11 motorised infantry battalions; 5 support battalions and 3 backing battalions; however, the motorised battalions are in reality not operational due to a lack of staff, equipment and vehicles.

Organization 
The territory is divided into 5 combined arms military regions (RMIA):
 RMIA1 (Yaoundé)
 RMIA2 (Douala)
 RMIA3 (Garoua)
 RMIA4 (Maroua)
 RMIA5 (Bamenda)

1st Military Region 
 11th Ebolowa Brigade:
 11th BCS (command and support battalion) in Ebolowa
 12th BIM (motorized infantry battalion) in Ebolowa
 12th BIM at Djoum
 13th BIM at Ambam
 11th BA (support battalion) at Sangmélima
 12th Bertoua brigade
 12th BCS in Bertoua
 14th BIM in Bertoua
15th BIM to Yokadouma 
16th BIM at Garoua-Boulaï
12th BA in Bertoua

2nd Military Region 

 Rapid Intervention Brigade
 Headquarters at Bafoussam
Special Amphibious Battalion (BSA) at Tiko
Airborne Battalion (BTAP) in Koutaba
Armored Reconnaissance Battalion (BBR) in Douala
 21st Motorized infantry brigade of Buéa
 21st BCS in Buéa
 21 BIM in Buéa
 22nd BIM at Mamfé
 23rd BIM at Loum
 24th BIM at Akwaya
 21st BA in Kumba
 201st Douala Air Base
 21st Air Transport Squadron
211st Transport and Assault Transport Squadron
212nd Transport and Assault Transport Squadron
22nd Air Squadron
221st Transport and Assault Transport Squadron
222nd Reconnaissance Squadron

Army equipment

Note that this list shows acquired equipment and not the equipment that are currently in service. Some of the listed equipment is out of service.

Cameroonian Air Force

The air force has bases in Garoua, Koutaba, Yaoundé, Douala and Bamenda. The Cameroonian Air Force was founded in 1960, the year of independence from France. There are under 400 troops in the air force. Cameroon's Air Force has 9 combat-capable aircraft.

Cameroon Navy

There are about 1,300 troops in the navy including naval infantry.

History
Around May 1999, Philip Njaru wrote a newspaper article where he alleged ill-treatment of civilians conducted by the 21st Navy Battalion based in Ekondo-Titi. In late May Njaru was approached by the local captain who asked Njaru "to stop writing such articles and to disclose his sources". Refusing to do this, Njaru five days later found his house encircled by armed soldiers, and escaped to Kumba. Here, he was assaulted by police in June 2001, with no particular reason stated. Njaru complained to the local authorities, but later learned that "his complaint had not been received".

Cameroon's Marine Nationale République modernised and increased its capabilities during 2000 with the acquisition of a number of small Rodman patrol craft and the retirement of some small older craft. A number of small patrol boats have been acquired or ordered from France. Latest estimates indicate naval strength consists of two combat patrol vessels, three coastal patrol vessels and approximately 30 smaller inshore and river patrol craft allocated to both the navy and the local gendarmerie. These include two 135 tonne Yunnan-class landing craft, which are able to carry and launch smaller craft for troop insertions. Some effort has been made to assess equipment needs to bring L'Audacieux P103 and Bakassi P104 to an effective combat status. This has resulted in weapons capabilities being reduced in favour of an increase in serviceability and the service is now effectively without missile attack capabilities. Bakassi (a Type P 48S missile patrol craft) completed a major refit at Lorient, France in August 1999. This included removing the Exocet missile system and EW equipment, and fitting a funnel aft of the mainmast to replace the waterline exhausts. New radars were also installed. Bakassi is now armed only with 40 mm cannon. Although the Bizerte (P48 large patrol craft) class L'Audacieux is fitted for SS-12M missiles these are not embarked and its operational status is in some doubt, having not been reported at sea since 1995. The Quartier-Maître Alfred Moto patrol boat was listed as out of service in 1991 but has since been reactivated.

Ships

List of active ships.
 1: DIPIKAR patrol boat (former French navy "Grèbe", upgraded with LYNCEA PATROL CMS) (Gun)
 2: FRA P-48 (Gun)
 6: Rodman 101/46 (Gun)
 1: Quartier class (Gun)
 3: Boston Whaler patrol boats
 1: Bakassi class patrol boat (P48S type)
 1: L’Audacieux class missile FAC (P48 type)
 1: Alfred Motto class patrol craft
 20: Swiftships type river boats
 2: Yunnan landing craft utility
 8: Simoneau
 2: Aresa 2400 CPV Defender patrol boats
 1: Aresa 2300 landing craft
 6: Aresa 750 Commandos RIBs
 5: 1200 Stealth RIBs
 1: 1200 Defcon RIB
 2:  P108 and P109 patrol boats

Two 32-metre patrol boats are expected to be delivered in February 2014.

Gendarmerie
The Gendarmerie is a paramilitary force composed of about 9,000 soldiers as of 2016. It performs both law enforcement and national security responsibilities across the country. (See Gendarmerie)

Military education 
After an initial period of development, training requirements were formalized in an April 1967 per government decree. There was a shortage of Cameroonian instructors at that time. The two educational institutions of the nation are the following:

 Combined Services Military Academy (Ecole Militaire Interarmes Camerounaises—EMIAC): It is the interforce academy for officers, being the educational center for future officers of the armed forces and the National Gendarmerie. It was established in 1959 and inaugurated on 18 January 1961. No officers were graduated until 1970. Every graduation of cadets takes place on 18 January.
 Non-Commissioned Officer Training School (Ecole des sous officiers du cameroun)

Both commissioned and noncommissioned officers were sent to various military schools in France, Greece, and the Soviet Union. The total number of Cameroonian military cadets with a Russian educational background were few.

References

External links

 Military appointments